The Denver and Rio Grande Western K-36 is a class of ten  narrow gauge 2-8-2 "Mikado" type steam locomotives built for the Denver and Rio Grande Western Railroad (D&RGW) by Baldwin Locomotive Works. They were shipped to the Rio Grande in 1925 and were first used along the Monarch Branch and Marshall Pass, but were later sent to the Third Division out of Alamosa. Of the original ten, four are owned by the Durango and Silverton Narrow Gauge Railroad (D&SNG) and five by the Cumbres and Toltec Scenic Railroad (C&TSRR). Number 485 fell into the turntable pit at Salida and was scrapped in Pueblo in 1955, with many parts being saved.

The locomotives are of outside-frame design, with the driving wheels placed between the two chassis frames which support the boiler, but with the cylinders, driving rods, counterweights and valve gear on the outside. This general arrangement is shared with the earlier K-27, K-28 and later K-37 Mikado engines.

Designation 
The locomotives' designation of K-36 comes from two different sources. The K in the designation comes from the locomotives' wheel arrangement (Mikado), and the 36 stands for 36,200 pounds of tractive effort.

In Service
The K-36s were used primarily as freight locomotives out of Alamosa to Durango and to Farmington, New Mexico, as well as out of Salida to Gunnison (over Marshall Pass) until 1955 and to Monarch on the Monarch Branch until 1956. They were built with special valves to allow brake control between locomotives while double-heading and were commonly found between Alamosa, Colorado and Chama, New Mexico. They were heavily used during the pipe boom in Farmington and hauled long freight trains between Alamosa and Farmington.

In 1937, three K-36s, Nos. 482, 483 and 489, were equipped with steam heat and signal lines to haul passenger trains like the Shavano and the San Juan Express. Eventually, in 1945, Nos. 484, 485 and 488 were also equipped, too.

As of 2022, eight of these locomotives still operate regularly. Nos. 483, 484, 487, 488 and 489 are owned by the Cumbres and Toltec Scenic Railroad (C&TSRR) and Nos. 480, 481, 482 and 486 are owned by the Durango and Silverton Narrow Gauge Railroad (D&SNG). However, No. 483 is stored out of service at Chama undergoing a full cosmetic restoration by the Friends of the C&TSRR as of 2016.

In late 2019, No. 489 temporarily went out of service for a new smokebox installation during its Federal Railroad Administration (FRA) mandated 1,472-day boiler inspection. However, due to COVID-19, No. 489 later returned to service in June 2021. On December 15, 2020, the C&TSRR announced that, in addition to the 1,472-day boiler inspection and rebuild, No. 489 will also be converted from coal-burning to oil-burning. Upon returning to service in June 2021, No. 489 is the first and only so far locomotive on the C&TSRR to be converted to oil-burning. On August 3, 2022, the C&TSRR announced that parts have been ordered for a second K-36 to be converted from coal-burning to oil-burning over the winter of 2022 to 2023. It hasn't been disclosed yet on which K-36 has been selected for the conversion. Meanwhile, on the D&SNG, Nos. 480 and 482 have also both been converted to oil-burning, with No. 480 re-entering service in June 2021 and No. 482 re-entering service on December 16, 2021. In August 2022, No. 486's tender was also converted to oil-burning for temporary use behind No. 480. The D&SNG will also eventually convert No. 486 from coal-burning to oil-burning as well.

Roster

References

2-8-2 locomotives
K-36
3 ft gauge locomotives
Baldwin locomotives
Railway locomotives introduced in 1925
Narrow gauge steam locomotives of the United States
Freight locomotives